Saint-Antoine-sur-Richelieu is a municipality in southwestern Quebec, Canada, on the Richelieu River in the Regional County Municipality of La Vallée-du-Richelieu. The population as of the Canada 2011 Census was 1,659.

Saint-Antoine-siur-Richelieu was the birthplace of Father of Confederation George-Étienne Cartier.

Demographics

Population
Population trend:

Language
Mother tongue language (2006)

See also
List of municipalities in Quebec

References

External links

Municipalities in Quebec
Incorporated places in La Vallée-du-Richelieu Regional County Municipality